The China Quality Certification Center (CQC, Chinese 中国质量认证中心, Pinyin Zhōngguó Zhìliàng Rènzhèng Zhōngxīn) is a Chinese administration based in Beijing with responsibilities for the implementation of product certification. It is responsible for product standards and quality standards sold on the Chinese market.

Superior administrations 
The CQC is under control of the China Certification & Inspection Group, which is approved by the State General Administration for Quality Supervision and Inspection and Quarantine and the Certification and Accreditation Administration of the People's Republic of China.

History 
The administration evolved from the former China Commission for Conformity Certification of Electrical Equipment, which was founded in 1985. In April 2002, the CQC was founded as a result of merging several organizations and administrative agencies (among them China National Import & Export Commodities Inspection Corporation Quality Certification Centre, Electrical Equipment Subcommittee, Home Appliance Subcommittee and CCIB Beijing Review Office). In September 2007, the authority was restructured in 2007. In 2014, CQC is the largest certification authority in China.

Membership 
CQC is a national certification body (NCB) and official member of the following organizations: 
 IQNet
 International Federation of Organic Agriculture Movements
 ANF
 CITA

See also
Guobiao
List of GB standards
Taiwan's Chinese National Standards
CCC China Compulsory Certificate
Voluntary CQC Mark Certification
CCAP China Certification Centre for Automotive Products
SAC Standardization Administration of China

References

External links 
 http://www.cqc.com.cn/www/english/

Certification marks
Economy of China
Safety codes
Foreign trade of China
Export and import control